Cutleria is the scientific name of two genera of organisms and may refer to:

Cutleria (alga), a genus of brown algae
Cutleria (animal), an extinct genus of synapsids